"Subterraneans" is a song by David Bowie, the closing track of his 1977 album Low. As with most of Side 2, "Subterraneans" is mostly instrumental, with brief, obscure lyrics sung near the song's end.

"Subterraneans" was first recorded in 1975 and intended for the soundtrack to the 1976 film The Man Who Fell to Earth. It was later revisited during the sessions for Low.

Musical characteristics 
After the Station to Station sessions ended in November 1975 at Cherokee Studios in Los Angeles, David Bowie recorded "Subterraneans" within those studios in December 1975. The song later received overdubs by Brian Eno.

The sleeve notes of Low credit "Peter and Paul with additional ARP synthesizer and piano". The "Peter and Paul" mentioned are Peter Robinson, who played Fender Rhodes, and Paul Buckmaster (the composer of the string arrangements for the Rolling Stones' "Moonlight Mile") who played the ARP Odyssey. Peter Robinson and Paul Buckmaster worked with Bowie at Cherokee Studios in late 1975 on the aborted movie soundtrack to The Man Who Fell to Earth.

"Subterraneans" was ultimately the most heavily edited song on Low, with David Bowie's saxophone, as well as multilayered synthesizers and reversed instrument sounds from Brian Eno, floating underneath a moaned vocal which is wordless until around the final ninety seconds. The soundscapes contain a cinematic quality which evokes the feel of Miles Davis' landmark album In a Silent Way.

Bowie related the song to the misery of those in East Berlin during the Cold War. According to Bowie, people who "got caught in East Berlin after the separation – hence the faint jazz saxophones representing the memory of what it was."

Live versions
 The song was used as an introduction to Bowie's set during the 1995 Outside Tour. It was different from the album version in that its lyrics and musical themes were merged from the song "Scary Monsters" (which would follow "Subterraneans" on the setlists). This version was performed alongside the co-headliners, Nine Inch Nails.

Personnel
David Bowie: Vocals, saxophone, reversed electric guitar, ARP String Ensemble
Paul Buckmaster: ARP Odyssey synthesizer
Peter Robinson : Reversed Fender Rhodes electric piano
Brian Eno: ARP 2600 synthesizer, piano
Carlos Alomar: Reversed electric guitar
George Murray: Reversed bass guitar
Tony Visconti: Production

Other versions
 Philip Glass – Low Symphony (1992)
 Nine Inch Nails – Live recording (with David Bowie) (1995)
 Dylan Howe – Jazz reconstruction for his album Subterranean – New Designs on Bowie's Berlin (2014)
 Alva Noto with Martin Gore (vocals) and William Basinski (saxophone) – vinyl and digital single (2022)

References

David Bowie songs
1977 songs
Songs written by David Bowie
Song recordings produced by Tony Visconti
Song recordings produced by David Bowie